Ion Ivanovici (alternatively: Jovan Ivanović, Iosif Ivanovici, Josef Ivanovich) (1845 – ) was a Romanian military band conductor and composer of Banat Serbian origin, best remembered today for his waltz Waves of the Danube.

Ivanovici was born in Timișoara, Austrian Empire.  His interest in music began after he learned to play a flute given to him when he was a child.

Ivanovici moved to and lived most of his life in Kingdom of Romania, Galați. Reaching the rank of officer in the Romanian army, his interest in military music culminates during his appointment as general inspector of military songs in 1900. In 1901 he settled in Bucharest where he died a year later.

Although today Ivanovici is chiefly remembered for his waltz "Waves of the Danube" ("Donauwellen" in German, "Flots du Danube", in French), in his lifetime he composed over 300 works (many of them lost today). 
Other notable compositions are Carol I March, dedicated to King Carol of Romania, "Carmen Sylva" waltz, dedicated to Queen Elisabeth of Romania, and "Romanian heart" waltz op 51 ("Inimă română" in Romanian , "Cordialité roumaine" in French).

His works were published by over sixty publishing houses throughout the world. In 1889, Ivanovici won the coveted march prize to mark the World Exhibition in Paris, out of 116 entries.

While some may dispute his nationality today, he is by all historical standards a Romanian composer of Serbian origin.

His great-grandson Andrei Ivanovitch is a successful international classical pianist.

Compositions
 Souvenir Moskau (Souvenir from Moscow) Waltz
 Erzherzog Carl Ludwig March, Op. 129
 La Serenade
 The Daughter of the Boatman, or Schiffers Tochterlein (La Fille du Marin)
 Seufzer Waltz (Sigh Waltz)
 Sinaia Waltz
 Szerenade Zigeuneren (Gypsy Serenade)
 Carmen Sylva Waltz from 1892
 Mariana Polka
 Romania's Heart Waltz, Op. 51
 Incognito Waltz
 Abschied von Focșani March (Farewell to Focsani March)
 Vision de l'Orient Waltz (Vision of the East), Op. 147
 Meteor Waltz
 Im Mondenglanz Waltz (Moonglow Waltz), Op. 122
 Magic of the Mountains Waltz
 Liebes Klange Polka (Love of Music Polka)
 Storm Galopp
 Wild Flowers Waltz
 Abendtraume Polka-Mazurka (Evening Dream Polka-Mazurka)
 Agatha Waltz
 Der Liebesbote Waltz (Messenger of Love Waltz), Op. 136
 Easy, like a Dream, also known as Legere, comme un reve in French and Leicht, wie der Traum in German
 Poker Polka, Op. 123
 Am Hofe der Czarin Waltz (In the Courts of the Princess Waltz), Op. 124
 Die Ballkönigin Waltz (King of the Ball Waltz), Op. 127
 Goldene Stunden Waltz (Golden Hours Waltz), Op. 128 from 1893
 Céline Polka-Mazurka, Op. 130
 Natalia Waltz, Op. 134
 Beim Pfanderspiel Polka, Op. 137
 Bluthenzauber Waltz, Op. 149
 Lieb' um Liebe Waltz (Love for Love Waltz), Op. 155
 Alina Waltz
 Amalia Waltz
 Life in Cyprus
 Souvenir de Brăila Quadrille
 Aurel Waltz
 Cleopatra Waltz
 Elena Polka-Mazurka
 Farmecul Peleșului
 Fata pescarului
 Frumoasa româncă Waltz
 Frumoșii ochi albaștri Song (The Beautiful Blue Eyes)
 Hora micilor dorobanți
 Herzliebchen Waltz
 Kalinderu March
 La balul curții Mazurka (The Mazurka of the Court's Ball)
 Luceafărul Waltz ("Luceafăr" is the popular name of the Venus star in Romanian)
 Military March
 Marșul Carol
 L'Odalisque Polka-Mazurka
 Pe Dunăre Mazurka (On the Danube Mazurka)
 Plăcerea balului Mazurka (The Pleasure of the Ball Mazurka)
 Porumbeii albi (The White Doves)
 Die Konigin des Morgens or The Queen of the Morning
 Rosina Polka from 1902
 Sârba moților ("Sârba" is a traditional dance, "moți" are peasants of Maramureș region)
 Suvenire Quadrille
 Maus Polka or Mouse Polka
 Tatiana Waltz
 Roses from the Orient Waltz
 Viața la București Waltz (Life in Bucharest Waltz)
 Visuri de aur Waltz (Golden Dreams Waltz)
 Zâna Dunării (The Fairy of The Danube)
 Anniversary Waltz
 Bavarian Ländler
 Kaiserreise or Voyage Imperial March
 La Bella Roumaine Waltz from 1901
 Danube Waves

References

External links
The Johann Strauss Society of Great Britain: Iosef Ivanovici

1845 births
1902 deaths
19th-century classical composers
19th-century Romanian male musicians
Male classical composers
Military music composers
Military musicians
Musicians from Timișoara
Romanian classical composers
Romanian people of Serbian descent
Romantic composers
Serbian composers
20th-century Romanian male musicians